The Pikesville Armory was built in 1903 to support the expansion of the National Guard program.  The second-oldest armory in Maryland, it was designed by architects Wyatt and Nolting.

It was added to the National Register of Historic Places in 1985.

References

External links
, including photo in 1980, at Maryland Historical Trust

Buildings and structures in Pikesville, Maryland
Armories on the National Register of Historic Places in Maryland
Infrastructure completed in 1903
National Register of Historic Places in Baltimore County, Maryland